Robin Alan Collins is an American philosopher. He currently serves as the Distinguished Professor of Philosophy and chair of the Department of Philosophy at Messiah University in Mechanicsburg, Pennsylvania.  His main interests include philosophical issues related to the relationship between religion and science and philosophical theology.

Education
Collins obtained his undergraduate degree from Washington State University in 1984 with a triple major in mathematics, Physics, and Philosophy, graduating summa cum laude.  Collins spent two years in a Ph.D. program in Physics at the University of Texas at Austin before transferring to the University of Notre Dame where he received a Ph.D. in philosophy in 1993. His dissertation was titled "Epistemological Issues in the Scientific Realism/Antirealism Debate: An Analysis and a Proposal."

He served as a post-doctoral fellow at Northwestern University's Program in History and Philosophy of Science before joining Messiah College.

Career

Collins was interviewed as a major contributor to The Case for a Creator by Lee Strobel.

References

External links 
 Dr. Collins's homepage
 The Case for Cosmic Design by Robin Collins. (Here Collins debates Paul Draper and Quentin Smith regarding whether the structure of the cosmos supports divine creation; it is part of the first online book debating theism and atheism/naturalism, at the leading atheist website infidels.org)
 Interviews with Collins for PBS program "Closer to Truth"

Intelligent design advocates
Living people
Year of birth missing (living people)
American theologians
Notre Dame College of Engineering alumni
Northwestern University faculty
Christian philosophers
Washington State University alumni
Messiah University
Critics of atheism
Distinguished professors of philosophy